"The Tale of the Three Beautiful Raptor Sisters, and the Prince Who Was Made of Meat" is a fantasy story by Brooke Bolander. It was first published in Uncanny Magazine, in 2018.

Synopsis

In a fairy tale setting, three dromeosaurid sisters have an unpleasant encounter with a handsome prince.

Reception
"The Tale of the Three Beautiful Raptor Sisters, and the Prince Who Was Made of Meat" was a finalist for the 2019 Hugo Award for Best Short Story.

Tangent Online found it to be "very light comedy, which provides a moderate amount of amusement", calling it "a featherweight story" and "quite lengthy".

References

Works originally published in online magazines
Fiction about dinosaurs
2018 short stories